Henry Green-Dupré, known by his stage names of Yvon Krevé and Von Von le Vet, is a French Canadian hip hop artist of Haitian origin. Krevé was rose to notice following collaborations with the duo Sans Pression. His 2000 debut, L'accent grave, topped the Quebec sales charts and was nominated for an ADISQ hip-hop award in 2001, and won best francophone album at the Canadian Music Awards. and in 2009 was described in the newspaper La Presse as one of the five albums that had defined Quebec rap. A single from that album, "Yvon Krevé", reached number one on the countdown programme for Canada's leading francophone music video channel (Décompte MusiquePlus). The name is a play on words: while Yvon is a not-uncommon first name, it matches the informal Quebec French pronunciation of ils vont (they will). Thus the full name sounds like ils vont crever, or "they will die".

Discography te torche1 8 septembre 2009
6 June 2000: L'accent grave
18 March 2003: Quand j'rap pas
25 October 2005: Von Von Le vet

See also
  Rap québécois, on French Wikipedia

References

External links
 Orange Music (label) site: Yvon Krevé
 HHQC: Yvon Krevé

Year of birth missing (living people)
Living people
Place of birth missing (living people)
Haitian emigrants to Canada
21st-century Black Canadian male singers
Canadian male rappers
Canadian hip hop singers
French-language singers of Canada
21st-century Canadian rappers